Michael George Forshaw (born 11 January 1952) is an Australian politician who served as a member of the Australian Senate for the state of New South Wales from May 1994 to June 2011, representing the Australian Labor Party.

Early life and education
Forshaw was born in Sydney. He was educated at the University of Sydney, where he graduated in arts, and the University of New South Wales, where he graduated in law.

Career
Forshaw was admitted as a barrister in 1985.

Forshaw began employment with the Australian Workers' Union in 1975 as an Industrial Officer and was elected as the union's Assistant General Secretary in 1989. In 1991 Forshaw was elected as the General Secretary of the AWU when he negotiated the amalgamation of the AWU with the Federation of Industrial Manufacturing & Engineering Employees (formerly the Federated Ironworkers' Association of Australia) to form the AWU-FIMEE Amalgamated Union. From 1993 until entering the Senate in 1994 Forshaw was the Joint National Secretary of the AWU-FIMEE Amalgamated Union (which changed its name back to the AWU in 1995).

A member of Labor's right faction, on 2 March 2010 Forshaw announced his decision to retire, citing he was making way for outgoing state party boss Matt Thistlethwaite.  His term ended on 30 June 2011.

In September 2016 he was elected to Sutherland Shire Council as a Councillor and in September 2020 he became Deputy Mayor.

Personal
Forshaw is married to retired Sutherland Shire Councillor Jan Forshaw  and has three sons, Simon, Martin and Jeremy.

References

1952 births
Living people
Australian Labor Party members of the Parliament of Australia
Labor Right politicians
Members of the Australian Senate
Members of the Australian Senate for New South Wales
University of New South Wales Law School alumni
Politicians from Sydney
People from the Sutherland Shire
University of Sydney alumni
21st-century Australian politicians
20th-century Australian politicians
People educated at De La Salle College, Cronulla